"Estonian Encyclopaedia" is Estonian encyclopaedia which was published in 1985-2007. From 1985 to 1990 its title was "Eesti nõukogude entsüklopeedia" (abbreviated ENE; in English: 'Estonian Soviet Encyclopaedia') and thereafter its title was "Eesti entsüklopeedia" (abbreviated EE).

In 2010 were started digitalization of the encyclopaedia.

Editors-in-chief were as follows:
Gustav Naan (1985-1989, editions I-IV), 
Ülo Kaevats (1989-1992), 
Toomas Varrak (1992-1995),
Ülo Kaevats (1995-2002; second time)
Hardo Aasmäe (2002-2007).

See also
Estonian Soviet Encyclopaedia

References

External links
Partly digitalized Estonian Encyclopaedia

Estonian encyclopedias